Peter Lurye (born July 25, 1957) is an American composer and lyricist from New York City.

Credits

Lurye is credited for theme music and/or songs in 
Animal Jam
Bear in the Big Blue House (Season 1, Season 2 & Season 3)
Cyberchase ("The Poddleville Case")
Dinosaur King (4Kids dub) Dora the Explorer - "Dora's Christmas Carol Adventure" and revised theme music in later installmentsDora and Friends: Into the City - Voices the Frogs, Mice, and HorsesEureeka's CastleGullah Gullah Island - Theme song composerGoGoRikiJungle Junction The Emperor's New Groove 2: Kronk's New Groove ("Be True To Your Groove")The Magic School Bus: The show's theme song "Ride on the Magic School Bus", written by Lurye, was performed by Little Richard.My Life as a Teenage Robot: Lurye and James L. Venable received the 2004 BMI Cable Award.Peter RabbitOctonauts (Creature Report Song)Out of the BoxStanley - performed by the Baha Men Sunny DayTeacher's PetViva Piñata''
A Little Game
MacGyver The Musical

References

External links
 

American male composers
21st-century American composers
Place of birth missing (living people)
American male songwriters
Living people
21st-century American male musicians
1957 births